Walter C. Taylor (February 18, 1870–1929), a.k.a. W.C. Taylor, was a North Dakota politician who served as the North Dakota Insurance Commissioner from 1911 to 1916.

Biography
Walter C. Taylor was born in Alexander, Minnesota on February 18, 1870. He moved to Devils Lake, North Dakota with his parents in 1886. He entered the newspaper business in 1890, purchasing Towner News, a small newspaper from Towner, North Dakota. He relocated to LaMoure, North Dakota, and edited their newspaper, The Chronicle in 1894. He was elected as the North Dakota Insurance Commissioner in 1910, and he served until 1916. Taylor died in 1929 at the age of 59.

Bibliography
 North Dakota Secretary of State. "North Dakota Blue Book" (1911), pp. 528.
 North Dakota Secretary of State. "North Dakota Blue Book" (2005), pp. 332.

1870 births
1929 deaths
Insurance Commissioners of North Dakota
20th-century American politicians